Thomas Carney (August 20, 1824 – July 28, 1888) was the second Governor of Kansas.

Biography
Carney was born in Delaware County, Ohio, to James and Jane (Ostrander) Carney.  James died in 1828, leaving a widow and four young sons. Thomas remained at home farming with his mother until age 19.  He was educated in Berkshire, Ohio, where he lived with an uncle.  He worked in mercantile businesses and finally established a successful wholesale business in Leavenworth, Kansas.   The year he was elected to the state legislature, he married Rebecca Ann Cannady.

Career
After his term as State Representative, Carney was elected Governor of Kansas and served from 1863 through 1865. During his tenure, he devoted his efforts to developing the state and addressing the issues caused by the Civil War. He was elected Mayor of Leavenworth in 1865.  A founder of the First National Bank of Leavenworth, he also served as Director of the Lawrence and Fort Gibson Railroad Company.

Carney was contemplating a run for the US Senate in 1871, when he admitted that he had accepted $15,000 from Republican senatorial candidate, Alexander Caldwell to leave the race and thereby allow Caldwell's election in 1871.

He continued in business until 1875.

Death
Carney died on July 28, 1888, in Leavenworth, Kansas, from apoplexy, and is buried there in Mount Muncie Cemetery.

References

External links

 
Publications concerning Kansas Governor Carney's administration available via the KGI Online Library
Legends of Kansas
The Political Graveyard
National Governors Association

|-

1824 births
1888 deaths
19th-century American politicians
American Presbyterians
Republican Party governors of Kansas
Mayors of places in Kansas
Republican Party members of the Kansas House of Representatives
People from Delaware County, Ohio
Politicians from Leavenworth, Kansas
Politicians from Cincinnati
Politicians from Columbus, Ohio
Union (American Civil War) state governors